David King (born 1970) is an American historian and writer. He lives in Lexington, Kentucky  and has taught European History at the University of Kentucky. He  authored the books: Finding Atlantis (2005), Vienna 1814 (2008), and Death in the City of Light: The Serial Killer of Nazi-Occupied Paris (2011).

Works
2005, USA, Finding Atlantis: A true story of genius, madness and an extraordinary quest for a lost world. New York: Harmony Books. 
2008, USA, Vienna, 1814: How the conquerors of Napoleon made love, war, and peace at the Congress of Vienna. New York: Harmony Books. 
2011, USA, Death in the City of Light: The Serial Killer of Nazi-Occupied Paris. New York: Crown. 
2017, USA, The Trial of Adolf Hitler: The Beer Hall Putsch and the Rise of Nazi Germany. New York:  W.W. Norton & Company.

References

1970 births
Living people
21st-century American historians
21st-century American male writers
American male non-fiction writers